Elections to Belfast City Council were held on 20 May 1981 on the same day as the other Northern Irish local government elections. The election used nine district electoral areas to elect a total of 51 councillors, most representing the more heavily populated north and west.

The DUP became the largest party, overtaking the UUP, while Grace Bannister from the UUP became the first female Lord Mayor.

Election results

Note: "Votes" are the first preference votes.

Districts summary

|- class="unsortable" align="centre"
!rowspan=2 align="left"|Ward
! % 
!Cllrs
! % 
!Cllrs
! %
!Cllrs
! %
!Cllrs
! %
!Cllrs
! %
!Cllrs
! %
!Cllrs
! %
!Cllrs
! %
!Cllrs
! %
!Cllrs
!rowspan=2|TotalCllrs
|- class="unsortable" align="center"
!colspan=2 bgcolor="" | DUP
!colspan=2 bgcolor="" | UUP
!colspan=2 bgcolor="" | Alliance
!colspan=2 bgcolor=""| SDLP
!colspan=2 bgcolor="" | PD
!colspan=2 bgcolor="" | IRSP
!colspan=2 bgcolor="" | UDP
!colspan=2 bgcolor="" | UPNI
!colspan=2 bgcolor="" | PUP
!colspan=2 bgcolor="white"| Others
|-
|align="left"|Area A
|bgcolor="#D46A4C"|39.3
|bgcolor="#D46A4C"|3
|33.5
|3
|12.1
|1
|9.2
|0
|0.0
|0
|0.0
|0
|0.0
|0
|0.0
|0
|0.0
|0
|5.9
|0
|7
|-
|align="left"|Area B
|bgcolor="#D46A4C"|33.5
|bgcolor="#D46A4C"|2
|26.8
|2
|23.0
|2
|1.1
|0
|0.0
|0
|0.0
|0
|2.0
|0
|11.0
|1
|0.0
|0
|2.6
|0
|7
|-
|align="left"|Area C
|21.6
|2
|bgcolor="40BFF5"|33.6
|bgcolor="40BFF5"|2
|28.6
|2
|9.4
|0
|0.0
|0
|0.0
|0
|0.0
|0
|3.3
|0
|0.0
|0
|3.3
|0
|6
|-
|align="left"|Area D
|0.0
|0
|3.3
|0
|5.3
|0
|bgcolor="#99FF66"|44.8
|bgcolor="#99FF66"|3
|17.0
|1
|10.9
|1
|0.0
|0
|0.0
|0
|0.0
|0
|18.7
|1
|6
|-
|align="left"|Area E
|bgcolor="#D46A4C"|35.1
|bgcolor="#D46A4C"|2
|22.1
|2
|5.8
|0
|3.5
|0
|0.0
|0
|0.0
|0
|6.5
|0
|0.0
|0
|11.1
|0
|15.9
|1
|6
|-
|align="left"|Area F
|bgcolor="#D46A4C"|26.4
|bgcolor="#D46A4C"|2
|18.4
|1
|10.0
|1
|20.8
|1
|0.0
|0
|15.2
|1
|0.0
|0
|0.0
|0
|0.0
|0
|9.3
|0
|6
|-
|align="left"|Area G
|bgcolor="#D46A4C"|24.8
|bgcolor="#D46A4C"|2
|17.7
|1
|3.1
|0
|7.5
|0
|19.6
|1
|0.0
|0
|14.3
|1
|0.0
|0
|0.0
|0
|13.0
|0
|6
|-
|align="left"|Area H
|21.7
|2
|bgcolor="40BFF5"|27.4
|bgcolor="40BFF5"|2
|11.5
|1
|19.6
|1
|0.0
|0
|0.0
|0
|0.0
|0
|0.0
|0
|2.5
|0
|17.3
|1
|7
|-
|- class="unsortable" class="sortbottom" style="background:#C9C9C9"
|align="left"| Total
|25.8
|15
|23.7
|13
|13.2
|7
|14.1
|6
|3.7
|2
|2.6
|2
|2.3
|1
|2.2
|1
|1.9
|1
|10.5
|3
|51
|-
|}

District results

Area A

1977: 2 x UUP, 2 x DUP, 2 x Alliance, 1 x SDLP
1981: 3 x DUP, 3 x UUP, 1 x Alliance
1977-1981 Change: DUP and UUP gain from Alliance and SDLP

Area B

1977: 3 x UUP, 2 x Alliance, 1 x DUP, 1 x UPNI
1981: 2 x DUP, 2 x UUP, 1 x Alliance, 1 x UPNI
1977-1981 Change: DUP gain from UUP

Area C

1977: 3 x Alliance, 2 x UUP, 1 x UPNI
1981: 2 x UUP, 2 x Alliance, 2 x DUP
1977-1981 Change: DUP (two seats) gain from Alliance and UPNI

Area D

1977: 4 x SDLP, 1 x Republican Clubs, 1 x Alliance
1981: 3 x SDLP, 1 x People's Democracy, 1 x IRSP, 1 x Independent Socialist
1977-1981 Change: People's Democracy and IRSP gain from Republican Clubs and Alliance, Independent Socialist leaves SDLP

Area E

1977: 2 x UUP, 1 x DUP, 1 x Alliance, 1 x Independent, 1 x Independent Unionist
1981: 2 x DUP, 2 x UUP, 1 x PUP, 1 x Anti H-Block
1977-1981 Change: DUP and Anti H-Block gain from Alliance and Independent, Independent Unionist joins PUP

Area F

1977: 2 x UUP, 1 x SDLP, 1 x DUP, 1 x Republican Clubs, 1 x Alliance
1981: 2 x DUP, 1 x SDLP, 1 x DUP, 1 x IRSP, 1 x Alliance
1977-1981 Change: DUP and IRSP gain from UUP and Republican Clubs

Area G

1977: 2 x UUP, 1 x SDLP, 1 x DUP, 1 x Republican Clubs, 1 x Alliance
1981: 2 x DUP, 1 x UUP, 1 x SDLP, 1 x IRSP, 1 x UDP
1977-1981 Change: DUP, IRSP and UDP gain from UUP, Republican Clubs and Alliance

Area H

1977: 2 x UUP, 2 x Alliance, 1 x SDLP, 1 x DUP, 1 x Independent Unionist
1981: 2 x UUP, 2 x DUP, 1 x SDLP, 1 x Alliance, 1 x Independent Unionist
1977-1981 Change: DUP gain from Alliance

References

Belfast City Council elections
Belfast